In 1919, the Kara-Kyrgyz Autonomous Oblast was created in Soviet Russia. This was the precursor to the Kirghiz Soviet Socialist Republic (commonly known as Kirghizia) which was established in 1936 as republic in its own right within the Union of Soviet Socialist Republics (USSR).

With the Soviet Union came electricity, water, irrigation, industrialization and literacy to Kyrgyzstan, and the other Soviet Central Asian countries. Scholars such as Alec Nove and J.A. Newth have argued that most development indicators suggests that the Soviet Muslim countries far-exceeded those Muslim countries outside the Soviet sphere of influence. The administrative, political and economic system was revolutionary by Kyrgiz standards, however, numerical indicators of development only partially supports this view, with one claiming that 63.2% of Kyrgyzstan's population still lived in rural areas. This was, however, the highest of any country in Central Asia. The country's higher urbanization rate is in large part because of its large Russian population, with most Europeans living in urban areas. Russian immigration slowed in 1959, the same year the national birth rate increased. However, the indigenous population had for the most part been untouched by Sovietization, an example being that religion was still widespread.

In spite of intense efforts to create socialism from "scratch", the social institutions led to infiltrations by religious, tribal and communal group into the political system. After the death of Joseph Stalin, the level of repression declined and less surveillance from the KGB and Moscow led to an increase in the importance of tribes in communal affairs.

Kara-Kirghiz Autonomous Oblast (1924–1925) and Kirghiz Autonomous Oblast (1925–1926)

Kirghiz Autonomous Soviet Socialist Republic (1926–1936)

Heads of government

Heads of party

Heads of state

Kirghiz Soviet Socialist Republic (1936–1991)

Heads of government

Heads of party

Heads of state

See also
President of Kyrgyzstan
Vice President of Kyrgyzstan
Prime Minister of Kyrgyzstan

References

Notes

Bibliography

External links 
 Republics of the Soviet Union

Kyrgyzstan
Communism in Kyrgyzstan
Political history of Kyrgyzstan
Lists of Kyrgyzstani politicians
Kyrgyzstan
Kyrgyzstan
Leaders